Isao Tanimura is a Japanese mixed martial artist. He competed in the Middleweight division.

Mixed martial arts record

|-
| Win
| align=center| 7-5
| Mario Stapel
| Decision (unanimous)
| Shooto: Wanna Shooto 2002
| 
| align=center| 2
| align=center| 5:00
| Setagaya, Tokyo, Japan
| 
|-
| Win
| align=center| 6-5
| Shigetoshi Iwase
| Decision (majority)
| Shooto: To The Top 9
| 
| align=center| 2
| align=center| 5:00
| Tokyo, Japan
| 
|-
| Loss
| align=center| 5-5
| Takuya Wada
| Decision (unanimous)
| Shooto: To The Top 5
| 
| align=center| 2
| align=center| 5:00
| Setagaya, Tokyo, Japan
| 
|-
| Win
| align=center| 5-4
| Rodney Ellis
| Decision (majority)
| Shooto: Wanna Shooto 2001
| 
| align=center| 2
| align=center| 5:00
| Setagaya, Tokyo, Japan
| 
|-
| Win
| align=center| 4-4
| Yuji Kusu
| Decision (unanimous)
| Shooto: Gig West 1
| 
| align=center| 2
| align=center| 5:00
| Osaka, Japan
| 
|-
| Loss
| align=center| 3-4
| Alex Cook
| KO (punches)
| Shooto: R.E.A.D. 5
| 
| align=center| 1
| align=center| 1:27
| Tokyo, Japan
| 
|-
| Win
| align=center| 3-3
| Takaharu Murahama
| Decision (unanimous)
| Shooto: R.E.A.D. 2
| 
| align=center| 2
| align=center| 5:00
| Tokyo, Japan
| 
|-
| Loss
| align=center| 2-3
| Seichi Ikemoto
| Decision (unanimous)
| Shooto: Renaxis 5
| 
| align=center| 2
| align=center| 5:00
| Kadoma, Osaka, Japan
| 
|-
| Win
| align=center| 2-2
| Tomoaki Hayama
| Decision (majority)
| Shooto: Renaxis 2
| 
| align=center| 2
| align=center| 5:00
| Tokyo, Japan
| 
|-
| Win
| align=center| 1-2
| Koichi Tanaka
| Decision (majority)
| Shooto: Shooter's Passion
| 
| align=center| 2
| align=center| 5:00
| Setagaya, Tokyo, Japan
| 
|-
| Loss
| align=center| 0-2
| Hiroyuki Kojima
| Technical Submission (kimura)
| Shooto: Gig '98 2nd
| 
| align=center| 1
| align=center| 4:37
| Tokyo, Japan
| 
|-
| Loss
| align=center| 0-1
| Saburo Kawakatsu
| Decision (unanimous)
| Shooto: Gig '98 1st
| 
| align=center| 2
| align=center| 5:00
| Tokyo, Japan
|

See also
List of male mixed martial artists

References

Japanese male mixed martial artists
Welterweight mixed martial artists
Living people
Year of birth missing (living people)